World TeamTennis (WTT) is a mixed-gender professional tennis league played with a team format in the United States, which was founded in 1973.

The league's season normally takes place in the summer months. Players from the ATP and WTA take a break from their tour schedules to partake in World TeamTennis.

WTT was the first professional sports league to grant equal status to each man and woman competing for their teams.

Many top tennis players have participated in the league over the years, including Billie Jean King, Rod Laver, Björn Borg, Chris Evert, John McEnroe, Evonne Goolagong, Jimmy Connors, Martina Navratilova, Andre Agassi, Pete Sampras, Michael Chang, Serena Williams, Venus Williams, Lindsay Davenport, Kim Clijsters, Martina Hingis, John Isner, Sam Querrey, Sloane Stephens, Naomi Osaka, and Frances Tiafoe.

Format 
Originally played on a no-line court, each match consists of five sets. Each set features a different configuration (men's singles, men's doubles, women's singles, women's doubles, and mixed doubles). Prior to each match, coaches decide the order in which the sets will be played. Each player on a team usually plays in at least one of the five sets. Scoring is no-advantage; there is no requirement to win a game by two points; at deuce, whoever scores the next point wins the game. The first team to reach five games wins each set. A nine-point tiebreaker is played if a set reaches four-all. One point is awarded for each game won. If necessary, extended play and a supertiebreaker are played to determine the winner of the match.

The original league format included a four-colored tennis court, a 44-contest season, and teams of at least two men and two women. A match consisted of the first player or team to win five games, with a nine-point tiebreaker at four-all, and no-ad scoring in women's singles and doubles, men's singles and doubles, and mixed doubles.

Courts
For much of World Team Tennis' history, its distinct court was an instant symbol for fans to recognize what they were watching. The iconic four-color (calico) court originated in the early 1970s and was unveiled for the third season in 1976. It was originally created to eliminate court lines (no-line court). Originally, the service boxes were blue and green, the baseline area brown and the doubles alleys maroon. These colors were chosen to represent the different tennis court surfaces: green for grass, blue for hard, maroon for clay and brown for dirt.

The league's technicolor playing surface served as a trendsetter for the rest of the tennis world. The Indian Wells Masters has purple courts.

Over time, lines were introduced to WTT's courts, purple replaced the brown and they reverted to traditional solid-colored courts. But in 2006, the league returned full-time to the signature calico/checkerboard pattern.

In 2019, the league made efforts to modernize and update its look and branding, including a switch to a deep blue playing surface and gray outer court. In partnership with DecoTurf, these colors were determined to be the best for livestreaming and television.

First league

Founding 
WTT was founded in 1973 by Dennis Murphy, Dick Butera, Fred Barman, Jordan Kaiser, and attorney and promoter Larry King, each of whom organized and owned the various participating teams of the fledgling professional tennis league. Murphy had previously founded the World Hockey Association, and gave a number of WHA club owners preferential options on WTT franchises.

Charles "Chuck" Reichblum (now popularly known as "Dr. Knowledge"), industrialist John H. Hillman III, and lawyer William "Bill" Sutton, who became the owners of the Pittsburgh Triangles, had, in 1972, founded the similar National Tennis League (NTL), a forerunner to WTT and Reichblum's brainchild. Founding members of WTT were reported to have been invited to join the NTL prior to formation of the competing WTT in 1973.

Teams, 1974–1978
In 1974, Billie Jean King began the first WTT season by securing the professional women tennis players. Dr. Leonard Bloom, Arthur Ashe, and Wilt Chamberlain helped to secure the professional men tennis players. Two WTT players, Connors and Goolagong, were not allowed to participate in the 1974 French Open due to their associations with WTT. Connors' exclusion from the French Open denied him the opportunity to become the first male player since Rod Laver to win all four Major singles titles in a calendar year.

The league began play in May 1974, with George MacCall as Commissioner of the 16 teams, many with tennis-themed nicknames. The Eastern Division consisted of the Atlantic Section: Baltimore Banners, Boston Lobsters, New York Sets, Philadelphia Freedoms; and the Central Section: Cleveland Nets, Detroit Loves, Pittsburgh Triangles, Toronto-Buffalo Royals. The Western Division consisted of the Gulf Plains Section: Chicago Aces, Florida Flamingos, Houston E-Z Riders, Minnesota Buckskins; and the Pacific Section: Denver Racquets, Hawaii Leis, Los Angeles Strings, San Francisco Golden Gaters.

Following the initial 1974 season several teams moved, folded, or failed to meet the financial requirements of the league, and the league also added one expansion team, the San Diego Friars. For the 1975 season World Team Tennis consisted of 10 teams, and it remained with that number of teams throughout the rest of the existence of the first league.

The teams that played from 1974 to 1978 were:
 Boston Lobsters (1974)
 Chicago Aces (1974)
 Cincinnati (never played) / Cleveland Nets (1974–1976) / Cleveland-Pittsburgh Nets (1977) / New Orleans Sun Belt Nets (1978)
 Dallas (1979 expansion franchise – never played)
 Denver Racquets (1974) / Phoenix Racquets (1975–1978)
 Detroit Loves (1974) / Indiana Loves (1975–1978)
 Golden Gate Otters (never played) / San Francisco Golden Gaters (1974–1978)
 Houston E-Z Riders (1974)
 Los Angeles (1979 expansion franchise – never played)
 Los Angeles Strings (1974–1978)
 Minnesota Buckskins (1974)
 New York Sets (1974–1976) / New York Apples (1977–1978)
 Pennsylvania Keystones (never played) / Soviet National Team (1977, often simply called "The Soviets") / Anaheim Oranges (1978)
 Philadelphia Freedoms (1974) / Boston Lobsters (1975–1978) (Elton John, a friend of Billie Jean King, wrote the hit single "Philadelphia Freedom" as a theme song for his favorite team.)
 Phoenix (never played) / Baltimore Banners (1974)
 Pittsburgh Triangles (1974–1976)
 St. Louis (never played) / Florida Flamingos (1974)
 San Diego (1979 expansion franchise – never played)
 San Diego Friars (1975–1978)
 San Diego Swingers (never played) / Hawaii Leis (1974–1976) / Sea-Port Cascades (1977) / Seattle Cascades (1978)
 Toronto-Buffalo Royals (1974) / Hartford Royals (never played)

WTT was the first professional sports experience for Jerry Buss (eventual owner of the NBA's Los Angeles Lakers and the NHL's Los Angeles Kings), and for Bob Kraft (eventual owner of the NFL's New England Patriots and MLS's New England Revolution).

All-star games and MVPs 
WTT also held annual All-Star games for the seasons from 1975 to 1978. Marty Riessen (Cleveland) and Greer Stevens (Boston) won Most Valuable Players (MVP) honors for the inaugural all-star gala won by the East, 28–21, at the Inglewood Forum in Los Angeles. In 1976 the West All-Stars, led by Chris Evert and Betty Stöve, capped an incredible comeback when they defeated Billie Jean King and Evonne Goolagong in a super tiebreaker, 5–4, giving the West a stunning 28–27 overtime victory at the Oakland–Alameda County Coliseum. After trailing at one stage by 24–17, the West, led by Stove and Dianne Fromholtz, won the final set plus two games in overtime to draw the West All-Stars even at 27. Tom Okker (San Francisco) and Dianne Fromholtz (Los Angeles) won MVP honors that year. In the 1977 All Star Game held at the San Diego Sports Arena, Björn Borg (Cleveland–Pittsburgh) and Betty Stöve (Seattle–Portland) captured MVP awards as the East bested the West, 23–18. WTT held its final All-Star event in Las Vegas in 1978.

Ending 
The first league ended play in 1978.

Second league

1981–1991 
League play resumed in 1981 as TeamTennis, with four California teams, expanding to eight teams in 1982. In 2005, the league had twelve teams.

In 1984, Billie Jean King became Commissioner and major owner of the league, following her retirement from tournament tennis competition.

In 1985 a recreational league for non-professionals was added, which was co-branded with the professional league.

1992–1999
In 1992, the name of the league was changed back to World TeamTennis.
 Minnesota Penguins, 1993
 Idaho Sneakers, 1994–1997
 New Jersey Stars, 1987–1995 (relocated and became the Delaware Smash)
 Phoenix Smash, 1992–1994

2000–present
In 2000 the current logo was adopted. In February 2001, Billie Jean King retired as Commissioner and Ilana Kloss became the new commissioner.

In 2005 and 2006 the league consisted of 12 teams and in 2007 the Hartford FoxForce ceased operations. Prior to the 2008 season, the Houston Wranglers ceased operations and the Washington Kastles joined the league. In the 2009 season, 10 teams competed: Boston, New York Buzz, New York Sportime, Philadelphia, Washington, D.C., Kansas City, Newport Beach, Sacramento, Springfield, and St. Louis. Sacramento won the year-end championship six times.

Before the start of the 2011 season the New York Buzz and the New York Sportimes merged into one New York team, the Sportimes. During the 2011 season the Washington Kastles completed a perfect 16–0 schedule, winning their second championship in three seasons.

In 2012, the Washington Kastles completed their second consecutive perfect season, going 16–0 for the second season in a row to become the first professional sports franchise to go two complete seasons without a loss. Their 32-match winning streak is one shy of the major professional sports record of 33 consecutive wins set by the 1971–72 Los Angeles Lakers of the National Basketball Association. They began the next season with 2 wins making their streak 34 games, setting the new record.

In 2013, World TeamTennis was renamed Mylan World TeamTennis after Mylan, a generics and specialty pharmaceuticals company, signed a three-year deal as the title sponsor. The Kansas City Explorers relocated to Irving, Texas, and became the Texas Wild. On November 21, 2013, the Orange County Breakers were sold, relocated to Austin, Texas and renamed the Austin Aces. On January 16, 2014, the New York Sportimes were sold, relocated to San Diego and renamed the San Diego Aviators. On February 4, 2014, the Sacramento Capitals were relocated to Las Vegas and renamed the Las Vegas Neon. On March 5, 2014, the Las Vegas Neon franchise was terminated, leaving the league with seven teams.

On February 23, 2015, WTT announced that a new ownership group had taken control of the Texas Wild and moved the team to Citrus Heights, California, renaming it the California Dream.

On January 13, 2016, WTT announced that the California Dream franchise had been terminated. On February 17, 2016, the Boston Lobsters had ceased operations and had been replaced with a new franchise called the New York Empire.

In March 2017, Billie Jean King announced the sale of her majority share in WTT to venture capitalist Mark Ein, the founder and owner of the Washington Kastles, and Fred Luddy, the founder of ServiceNow and owner of the San Diego Aviators.

In January 2019, Carlos Silva became the CEO and ushered in new deals with CBS and ESPN creating the largest-ever audience for WTT on July 21, 2019, on a CBS broadcast.

In March 2019, the league announced its expansion to eight teams for the 2019 season, with the creation of the Orlando Storm and the Vegas Rollers.

On October 23, 2019, the league announced it would be awarding a record $5 million in prize money, including an additional $1 million for the postseason, during its 45th season and would be expanding again, adding two new franchises in 2020.

In February 2020, the league announced its expansion to nine teams for the 2020 season with the Chicago Smash.

In June 2020, WTT announced it would be the first major professional tennis league to resume operations since the worldwide outbreak of COVID-19. The league committed to play the entirety of its 45th season at The Greenbrier in White Sulphur Springs, West Virginia from July 12 through August 2.

In March 2021, Carlos Silva stepped down as CEO. The current COO is Allen Hardison. The 2021 season was November 13–28 at the Indian Wells Tennis Garden.

After the ATP and WTA suffered COVID-related delays that only finished their 2021 seasons in November, WTT announced it would not hold a 2022 season, while promising to return in 2023 with new expansion teams.

Current teams

Finals
References:

Historical results
Current WTT teams are shown in bold,  non-championship teams are shown in italics.

By team

By city

See also

 U.S. intercollegiate team tennis champions

References

Inline citations

General references
 Greg Hoffman, The Art of World Team Tennis, San Francisco Book Company, 1977 
 World TeamTennis, official website
 Brief History of World TeamTennis. From the WTT site.
 WTT Logos
 More WTT Logos

External links

WTT player rosters

 
1973 establishments in New York (state)
Tennis leagues in the United States
Exhibition tennis tournaments
Tennis organizations
Sports leagues established in 1973
Sports leagues in the United States
Professional sports leagues in the United States
Forms of tennis